Santa Cruz do Sul is a city in central Rio Grande do Sul, Brazil.  The city has an estimate 131,000 inhabitants as of 2020 and sits about 150 km (93 miles) from the capital city of the state, Porto Alegre.  The city enjoys a high standard of living and gross income per capita is 2.5 times greater than that of the state of Rio Grande do Sul as a whole.

History
Santa Cruz do Sul was founded on March 31, 1877 by German immigrants, most of whom came from Hunsrück. Even today, the so-called Riograndenser Hunsrückisch is spoken actively in the area around the city. In 1924, a Protestant church was built according to the plans of two German architects. It is one of the largest Protestant Lutheran churches in Rio Grande do Sul and the largest neo-Romanesque church in Latin America. The Protestant church, renovated in 1999 with an organ from 1887 of the German company Ibach from Barmen.

Demographics
The population of Santa Cruz do Sul has steadily increased, with help from immigration to Brazil during its early history – in 1849 there were 12 inhabitants, ten years later the city population had reached 2723 people, and in 1878 there were ten thousand inhabitants. Most of the early immigrants were farmers and craftsmen.

Agriculture
The area around Santa Cruz do Sul is mainly agricultural, and produces large quantities of tobacco and soy beans for animal fodder.  Most of the tobacco produced in the area is exported as a raw material for cigarette manufacturing plants all over the world.  Soy bean processing plants sell several million tons of animal fodder annually, for domestic use and for export.

Oktoberfest

Each year, the citizens of Santa Cruz do Sul and visitors from the region celebrate Oktoberfest.  The city has a large population of German-Brazilians.  Thousands turn out each year for the celebration. The Oktoberfest in Santa Cruz do Sul is the third largest in the world, leaving behind only the Oktoberfest in Munich in Germany and Oktoberfest Blumenau of the state of Santa Cartarina in Brazil as well.

Tourism

The Cathedral of São João Batista is one of the main tourist draws in the city.  The adjacent block in front of the Cathedral, Getúlio Vargas Square, is adorned with fountains and trees.  São João Batista Cathedral is one of the largest cathedrals in all of Brazil. The main edifice was built between 1928 and 1932 and the two 82-meter (269 ft) tall towers were added later.

Sports
The Autódromo Internacional de Santa Cruz do Sul is a motorsport racetrack opened in 2005. It hosts rounds of the Stock Car Pro Series and Copa Truck.

The two main footbal clubs are Esporte Clube Avenida and Futebol Clube Santa Cruz, which play in the Campeonato Gaúcho Série A2.

Transportation
The city is served by Luiz Beck da Silva Airport.

Awards
The Prefeitura Municipal de Santa Cruz do Sul won a 2004 Energy Globe Award for the João-de-Barro Bom-Plac House Project.

Notable people
 Ana Hickmann, Brazilian model
 Lucas Kohl, Brazilian racing driver
 Irton Marx, journalist and politician

Notes

References

External links

  Santa Cruz do Sul City Hall website
  Gazeta do Sul - News from Santa Cruz do Sul
Estacionamento Rotativo de Santa Cruz do Sul - Rapidinho
Santa Cruz Oktoberfest site
A Communitarian University - Universidade de Santa Cruz do Sul

 
Populated places established in 1877
German-Brazilian culture
1877 establishments in Brazil
Municipalities in Rio Grande do Sul